This article displays the rosters for the participating teams at the 2002 FIBA Africa Club Championship.

Abidjan Basket Club

Asec Mimosas

Capo Libreville

Inter Club Brazzaville

Kenya Ports Authority

Primeiro de Agosto

Stade Malien

See also
2001 FIBA Africa Women's Clubs Champions Cup squads

References

External links
 2012 FIBA Africa Champions Cup Participating Teams

FIBA Africa Clubs Champions Cup squads
Basketball teams in Africa
FIBA